The 12th World Rowing U23 Championships was the 12th edition of the World Rowing U23 Championships and was held from 21 to 26 August 2016 at the Willem-Alexander Baan in Rotterdam, Netherlands in conjunction with the World Junior Rowing Championships and the World Rowing Championships. The annual rowing regatta is organized by FISA (the International Rowing Federation), and held at the end of the northern hemisphere summer.

Medal summary

Men's events

Women's events

See also 
 Rowing at the 2016 Summer Olympics
 2016 World Rowing Championships
 World Rowing Junior Championships 2016

References

External links 
 Official website
 WorldRowing website

World Rowing U23 Championships
U23
International sports competitions hosted by the Netherlands
Sports competitions in Rotterdam
2016 in Dutch sport
2016 in rowing
August 2016 sports events in Europe